de Toledo High School, formerly New Community Jewish High School and informally known as "New Jew", is a private Jewish high school in the West Hills neighborhood of Los Angeles, in the western San Fernando Valley, California.  One of the largest Jewish day schools in the United States, the school adopted its new name  as of July 1, 2015.

Curriculum
The school offers a college preparatory program for students in grades 9-12 featuring college-preparatory courses, rigorous academics, 18 AP courses, STEM, championship athletic teams, leadership opportunities, extra curricula, comprehensive college counseling, visual/performing arts, summer programs, and global education exchange programs.

History
The school was founded in 2002 with 40 students, and was originally located at the West Hills campus of the Jewish Federation of Greater Los Angeles.  It outgrew the available space within two years, and relocated its campus to shared spaces at Shomrei Torah Synagogue, a Conservative synagogue in West Hills.

The school outgrew that location also (then with 400 students), and in January 2011 it purchased the entire former Jewish Federation campus where it had begun. The school reopened there, after remodeling was completed, to begin the 2013–2014 academic year.

In October 2014, after receiving a "transformative gift" from Philip and Alyce de Toledo of Sherman Oaks, the school's trustees decided to rename the school in their honor, beginning with the 2015–2016 school year.

See also
Shadow Ranch Park

References

External links
Official website

High schools in the San Fernando Valley
High schools in Los Angeles
Jewish day schools in California
Pluralistic Jewish day schools
Private high schools in California
Jews and Judaism in Los Angeles
West Hills, Los Angeles
Educational institutions established in 2002
2002 establishments in California